European Air Charter (formerly Bulgarian Air Charter) is a Bulgarian charter airline headquartered in Sofia.

History 
European Air Charter was established as Bulgarian Air Charter in 2000 and started operations on 14 December 2000 as a wholly owned subsidiary of the Aviation Service Group. It operates flights for several tour operators to destinations mostly in Austria, the Czech Republic, Germany, Israel and Poland. 

Since the period the airline was founded, it has transported more than 3.5 million passengers. The company has 330 employees. The airline has its own maintenance unit which has capabilities on McDonnell Douglas MD-80 series and Boeing 737 Classic series aircraft covering airframe, engines and landing gear services and overhaul of aircraft components. The airline started operations with five Tupolev Tu-154s. In 2004, the airline retired these aircraft and replaced them with seven McDonnell Douglas MD-80. By 2011, the Bulgarian Air Charter fleet had grown to 12 MD-80s. In September 2015, Bulgarian Air Charter added its first Airbus A320-200 to its fleet.

In May 2021, Bulgarian Air Charter announced it was changing its name to European Air Charter.

Destinations 

European Air Charter operates to the following destinations (as of August 2021):

Fleet

Current fleet
As of February 2023, the European Air Charter fleet consists of the following aircraft:

Former fleet
European Air Charter also used to operate Tupolev Tu-154s which have since been phased out.

See also
 List of airlines of Bulgaria

References

External links

 

Airlines of Bulgaria
Airlines established in 2000
Charter airlines
Bulgarian companies established in 2000